Hout, van Hout and van den Hout are Dutch surnames meaning "wood", "timber" or "of the wood". Notable people with the surname include:

Hout
Michael Hout (born 1950), American sociologist
Morgan Hout (born 1940s), American football coach
Van Hout
Cor van Hout (1957–2003), Dutch kidnapper
 (1542–1609), Dutch statesman, "city secretary" of Leiden
 (1908-1945), Dutch racing cyclist
Joris Van Hout (born 1977), Belgian footballer
Kristof Van Hout (born 1987), Belgian football goalkeeper
Léon van Hout (1864-1945), Belgian violinist and music educator
Roald van Hout (born 1988), Dutch footballer
Ronnie van Hout (born 1962), New Zealand artist
Russell Van Hout (born 1976), Australian former racing cyclist
Van den Hout
 (born 1964), Dutch Roman Catholic bishop
Willem van den Hout (1915-1985), Dutch writer and publicist

Al-Hout
"(Al-)Hout" is a common romanization of the Arabic surname  (al)-ḥūt, meaning "(the) whale". People with this name include:
Shafiq al-Hout (1932-2009), Palestinian politician and writer, a founder of the Palestine Liberation Front and the Palestine Liberation Organization

See also
Houts, surname including "van Houts"
Van Houten, Dutch surname

Dutch-language surnames